Estadio Las Delicias is a multi-use stadium in Santa Tecla, El Salvador.  It is currently used mostly for football matches and is the home stadium of Santa Tecla F.C. The stadium holds 10,000 spectators.

Sport events
The stadium will be one of the venues for the 2023 Central American and Caribbean Games.

References

External links 
 
  (Stadium Information)

Las Delicias